Post-amendment to the Tamil Nadu Entertainments Tax Act 1939 on 12 June 2000, gross fell to 125 per cent of nett. The Commercial Taxes Department disclosed 71.19 crore in entertainment tax revenue for the year.

A list of films released in the Tamil film industry in India in 2002:

List of Tamil films

January—March

April—June

July—September

October—December

Other releases
The following films also released in 2002, though the release date remains unknown.

Dubbed films

Awards

References

2002
Films, Tamil
Lists of 2002 films by country or language
2000s Tamil-language films